Svatoslav may refer to:

 People
 Svatoslav Galík (1938–2019), Czech orienteering competitor
 Svatoslav Ton (born 1978), Czech high jumper

 Places
 Svatoslav (Brno-Country District), a village and municipality (obec) in the South Moravian Region of the Czech Republic
 Svatoslav (Třebíč District), a village and municipality (obec) in the Vysočina Region of the Czech Republic

See also
 Sviatoslav

Czech masculine given names